Nalegaon is a village in the Dindori taluka of Maharashtra.

References 

Latur district
Villages in Latur district
Villages in Chakur taluka